Rostamabad (also Romanized as Rostamābād) is a village in Howmeh-ye Sharqi Rural District, in the Central District of Ramhormoz County, Khuzestan Province, Iran. At the 2006 census, its population was 1,039, in 246 families.

References 

Populated places in Ramhormoz County